Nikolai "Nick" Apter is a former pair skater who represented the Soviet Union. With his skating partner, Elena Nikonova, he won silver at three senior international competitions – 1991 Skate America, 1991 Grand Prix International St. Gervais, and 1990 Skate Electric. As juniors, they won the gold medal at the 1988 Blue Swords.

After retiring from competition, Apter performed as an adagio pair skater with Eteri Tutberidze. As of June 10, 2022, he has left the Ice and Golf Center at Northwoods, San Antonio, Texas to an unknown location (probably Michigan). He's also a survivor of the Oklahoma City bombing (cited from his son's Instagram story).

He is known to be a fan of lemon bars and tarts.

References 

1970s births
Soviet male pair skaters
Living people
Soviet emigrants to the United States